Paramount Records was a record label started in 1969 by Paramount Pictures (then a unit of Gulf+Western) after acquiring the rights to the name from George H. Buck. A previous Paramount Records, active between 1917 and 1932, had been unconnected to Paramount Pictures. The new Paramount label reissued pop releases by sister label Dot Records, which had recently become a country label and, in the process, had its entire pop back catalog deleted completely. It also released new albums from other pop musicians and soundtracks to Paramount films such as Paint Your Wagon, among others. Cast members of the Paramount Television series The Brady Bunch were signed, and the label issued several tie-in albums and singles.

After Gulf+Western sold its record label holdings to ABC (which happened to have aired the Brady Bunch TV series) in 1974, the Paramount label was discontinued in favor of ABC Records, which itself was sold to MCA Records in 1979. The Paramount catalog is now owned by Universal Music Group and managed by Geffen Records (whose founder, David Geffen, later became a co-founder of DreamWorks, which was a sister studio to Paramount from 2006 to 2008, and whose own record catalog is now owned by Universal).

On a side note, MCA continued to release soundtracks to some later Paramount films into the 1990s. Sliding Doors (1998) was the last Paramount release to have its soundtrack issued by MCA.

In 2015, Paramount Pictures revived the label as Paramount Music - a record label specializing in soundtracks from Paramount movies, with distribution by TuneCore.

See also
 List of record labels
 Paramount Music

External links
Paramount Records info at BSN Publications

Defunct record labels of the United States
Pop record labels
Reissue record labels
Paramount Pictures
Record labels established in 1969
Record labels disestablished in 1974
Gulf and Western Industries